Walt Disney: An American Original is a 1976 non-fictional book by Bob Thomas considered to be the definitive biography of Walt Disney.

Publication history
It was later republished by Disney Editions in 1994.

See also
Walt: The Man Behind the Myth-2001 documentary about Walt
Golden Age of American animation
The Disney Version-the 1968 book by film critic Richard Schickel

References

Books about Disney
1976 non-fiction books
Works about Walt Disney
Disney books
American biographies
Biographies (books)
Simon & Schuster books